Dudhmukhi Wildlife Sanctuary is a wildlife sanctuary located near Sarankhola in Bagerhat District of Bangladesh. It was officially declared as a wildlife sanctuary by the government of Bangladesh on 29 January 2012.

It is one of the safe zones for vultures as per the Vulture Safe Zone-2 Schedule of the government of Bangladesh in 2012. Most of the area of Dudhmukhi consists of wetlands and Dudhmukhi river is one of the dolphin sanctuaries in Bangladesh.

See also
 List of wildlife sanctuaries of Bangladesh

References 

Wildlife sanctuaries of Bangladesh